Bafatá is a town in central Guinea-Bissau, known as the birthplace of Amílcar Cabral. The town has a population of 22,501 (2008 est). It is the capital of Bafatá Region as well as the seat of the Roman Catholic Diocese of Bafatá, which was established in March 2001 with Carlos Pedro Zilli as bishop.

Bafatá is noted for its brickmaking. By the 1880s it was an established trading centre for the Portuguese, including peanuts, cattle, hides, textiles, and salt.

Landmarks
The town is served by Bafatá Airport, an airstrip, and a regional hospital. There is a hotel, the Bafatá Apartamento Imel. The restaurant Ponto de Encontro serves Portuguese cuisine. The surrounding forests are noted for their monkey and antelope populations, and Maimama Cape, owned by a Cape Verdean, organizes trips to visit the animals for tourists. The town is in a derelict state; the streets contain tumbleweeds and cracked tarmac. Several of the main avenues are named Bissau, Brazil and Guiana.

Gallery

References

 
Bafatá Region
Populated places in Guinea-Bissau
Geba River
Sectors of Guinea-Bissau